Gloria Jessica (née Gultom; born 25 June 1994) is an Indonesian singer-songwriter of Batak descent. She was one of the contestants of the second season of The Voice Indonesia (2016), broadcast by the national television station RCTI. She started gaining wide public attention after performing her rendition of Coldplay's "A Sky Full of Stars" in the knockout round of the singing contest. On YouTube, the video of the performance made its way to the very top of nationally "trending" videos and held its position there for more than a week. 
In the same year, she signed with Universal Music Indonesia. Her fifth single, "Hold On", is the first one fully in English and written by herself in collaboration with Joseph Saryuf of Santamonica and Direct Action. "Buka Mata", released in 2019, is also a product of their collaboration. The following year saw Gloria working with American musicians Kyle Patrick and Jesse Ruben, resulting in the single "Still Worth Loving". In 2021, "Berlalu" was released. The song was produced by a trio of prominent Indonesian musicians/producers: Widi Puradiredja of Maliq & D'Essentials, Kimo Rizky of Kimokal, and Joseph Saryuf.

Gloria received the award for "Best New Artiste (Female)" in the 2017 edition of Anugerah Planet Muzik, an event appreciating Malay musicians from Malaysia, Singapore, and Indonesia. Two of her singles have been nominated in Anugerah Musik Indonesia, the Indonesian version of Grammy Awards.

Her fans formed a dedicated "friendbase" named GlowJes which periodically organizes meet-and-greets and gatherings. Her friendship and frequent collaborations with model/drummer/vlogger/actress Rani Ramadhany resulted in their fans' forming another fanbase named RRGJ.

Performances on The Voice Indonesia 2016 

 – The performance gained more than 1 million views on Youtube in a week
 – The performance was one of "5 amazing knockout performances" on The Voice Global

Discography

Singles 
 Dia Tak Cinta Kamu (2016)
 I Just Wanna Love You (2017)
 Setia (2018)
 Luka yang Kecil (2018)
 Hold On (2018)
 Buka Mata (2019)
 Still Worth Loving (2020)
 Berlalu (2021)

Awards and nominations

Anugerah Musik Indonesia
Anugerah Musik Indonesia (translation: Indonesian Music Awards) is an annual Indonesian music awards equivalent to Grammy Awards or Brit Awards. The award was formalized in 1997 by ASIRI (Association of Indonesia Recording Industry), PAPPRI (Association of Indonesian Singers, Songwriters and Music Record Producers), and KCI (Copyright Office of Indonesia).

|-
| rowspan= "1" | 2017
| rowspan= "1" | "Dia Tak Cinta Kamu"
| Best Newcomer
| 
|-
|}

Anugerah Planet Muzik
Anugerah Planet Muzik is an annual awards ceremony appreciating Malay musicians from Indonesia, Singapore, and Malaysia.

|-
| rowspan= "1" | 2017
| "Dia Tak Cinta Kamu"
| Best New Artiste (Female)
| 
|-
|}

Dahsyatnya Awards
Dahsyatnya Awards is an annual awards ceremony presented by the daily Indonesian TV show Dahsyat, which is broadcast by RCTI, one of Indonesia's biggest & oldest TV channels.

References

External links

1994 births
Living people
The Voice (franchise) contestants
People of Batak descent
21st-century Indonesian women singers
Indonesian pop singers